Rabbit hunting or rabbit hunt is hunting for rabbits. The expressions may also refer to one of the following:

Rabbit hunting (poker), a poker term 
Hiawatha's Rabbit Hunt, a Warner Bros. cartoon in the Merrie Melodies series
Rabbit-hunt game, a scenario in the game BZFlag
Celle rabbit hunt, a massacre of concentration camp internees  in northern German town of Celle, Prussian Hanover
Rabbit Hunt, a comic collection from the Kane series by Paul Grist